Bernard Daniel Joseph is a South African politician. A member of the Economic Freedom Fighters,  he served as a Member of the Western Cape Provincial Parliament from 2015 to 2019. He was the first chairperson of the party in the Western Cape. From 2014 to 2015, he was a Member of the National Assembly. Before he held elected office, he was an employee at the Western Cape Community Safety Department.

Political career
He was a member of the Congress of the People before he joined the Economic Freedom Fighters. Joseph said that he left the party because he felt that the party lacked leadership and movement. He joined the Economic Freedom Fighters to implement the party's policies.

Before the 2014 South African general election, the Economic Freedom Fighters announced their election lists. Joseph was the first candidate on the party's regional list, third on the party's provincial list and seventy-second on the national list. He was elected to the National Assembly and took office on 21 May 2014.

He resigned as a Member of the National Assembly in May 2015. Joseph was subsequently sworn in as a Member of the Western Cape Provincial Parliament on 21 May 2015. He left the Provincial Parliament in May 2019.

References

Year of birth missing (living people)
Economic Freedom Fighters politicians
Congress of the People (South African political party) politicians
Coloured South African people
Members of the Western Cape Provincial Parliament
Members of the National Assembly of South Africa
Living people